Lord of Huaman Festival is a patronal feast celebrated every year in the Peruvian town of Santiago de Huamán, in the western part of the city of Trujillo. This Christian celebration has been held for more than 300 years.

History
The origin of this tradition dates back more than 300 years. It is a religious festival that attracts pilgrims and tourists who visit the historic Church of Santiago de Huaman. The celebration of the festival takes place from 13 to 27 May in honor of the Lord of Huaman; novenas, rosaries and confessions are offered by the faithful devotees. The celebrations also include morning and afternoon sports. On the event's main day, special celebrations are performed including flag hoisting, a solemn mass held by the Archbishop of Trujillo, a procession with the sacred image and the entrance into the church with a band of musicians. In one of the chests they discovered a priest's clothes, in the second the clothes of a saint, and in the third the holy image of the Lord in parts. They took everything to the town where they assembled and dressed the sacred image. One of the seamen upon waking said, "Lord Huaman, save us!" and thus named the saint. When the Bishop of Trujillo learned of the discovery, he ordered the construction of a chapel at the site but it was destroyed. It was later rebuilt and again destroyed; the natives and fishermen then decided to build the church in the village of Huaman.

Events
The procession of the patron Lord of Huaman through the town streets. In the 2012 festival, the Lord of Huaman was taken in procession to the cathedral of Trujillo and was returned the same way to the sanctuary in Huamán.
Morning and afternoon sports; in 2012 the festival included a marathon.
Solemn mass held by the Archbishop of Trujillo.
They place their stands around the Main Square of Huaman.

See also
Trujillo
Marinera Festival
Trujillo Spring Festival
Trujillo Book Festival
International Festival of Lyric Singing
Carnival of Huanchaco
Las Delicias beach
Huanchaco
Santiago de Huamán
Victor Larco Herrera District

References

External links

Location of Santiago de Huaman, the place of the festival

Multimedia
 

Festivals in Trujillo, Peru
History of Trujillo, Peru